Andrew Downey Orrick (October 18, 1917 – January 27, 2008) was  a partner with Orrick, Herrington & Sutcliffe and the acting chairman  of the U.S. Securities and Exchange Commission in San Francisco.

Biography
He was born on October 18, 1917, in San Francisco, California, to William Horsley Orrick Sr. He had a brother, William Horsley Orrick Jr. Downey graduated from Yale University in 1940, where he was a member of Skull and Bones.  At Yale, while playing for the Yale baseball team, he hit the longest home run. He served during World War II, then attended UC Hastings College of the Law in San Francisco. He then joined Orrick, Herrington & Sutcliffe in 1947.

He was San Francisco chairman of Citizens for Eisenhower in 1952. In 1962 he was the Northern California chairman of Richard Nixon's campaign for Governor of California. He became the San Francisco administrator of the U.S. Securities and Exchange Commission in December 1954. He was renominated to the position in 1957 and served until 1960.

He died on January 27, 2008, in San Francisco, California.

References

1917 births
2008 deaths
Lawyers from San Francisco
Military personnel from California
Members of the U.S. Securities and Exchange Commission
Yale University alumni
United States Army personnel of World War II
University of California, Hastings College of the Law alumni
Andrew Downey
Eisenhower administration personnel
United States Army officers
Orrick, Herrington & Sutcliffe people